GeneXus (formerly Artech Consultores SRL) is a Uruguayan software producer, founded by Breogán Gonda and Nicolás Jodal in 1988. Its most famous product is Genexus, a software development tool that is sold to over 30 countries, having produced $50 million profits in the last year.

With the success of the tool, the company decided to change its name to Genexus SA. It was subsequently acquired by Globant on April 20, 2022.

GeneXus 

GeneXus is developed by ARTech.

GeneXus is a tool that works from "users’ visions"; it captures the knowledge contained in them and systematizes it within a knowledge base. From its knowledge base it is capable of designing, generating and maintaining 100% automatically the data base and application
programs (programs that are necessary in order for the users to operate with their visions).

References

External links 

Software companies of Uruguay
1988 establishments in Uruguay
Companies established in 1988
2022 mergers and acquisitions